The Kiryat Shmona massacre was an attack by three members of the Popular Front for the Liberation of Palestine - General Command on civilians in the Israeli town of Kiryat Shmona on 11 April 1974. Eighteen people were killed, nearly half of them children, and 16 were wounded.

The attack
On 11 April 1974, three members of the Popular Front for the Liberation of Palestine - General Command crossed the Israeli border from Lebanon. First, they entered the Janusz Korczak elementary school, but it was the Passover holiday and the school was unoccupied. They then decided to enter another building nearby. They killed many of that building's residents. The attackers then blew themselves up as Israeli soldiers stormed the building.

Aftermath 
More attacks on northern Israel followed by Palestinian militants, including the Ma'alot massacre the same year, the Savoy Hotel attack and Kfar Yuval hostage crisis in 1975, and multiple airplane hijacking acts, the most notable being Entebbe Operation in 1976.

See also

List of massacres in Israel
Palestinian political violence

External links 
 Israel Forces Attack 6 Lebanese Villages in Retaliatory Raids - published on the Los Angeles Times on 13 April 1974

References 

Spree shootings in Israel
Murdered Israeli children
1974 in Israel
Suicide bombing in the Israeli–Palestinian conflict
Mass murder in 1974
April 1974 events in Asia
Massacres in 1974
1974 murders in Israel